Moya is a municipality in Cuenca, Castile-La Mancha, Spain. It has a population of 194 (2010).

Municipalities in the Province of Cuenca